NRP may refer to:

Science
 Neuropilin
 Nonribosomal peptide
 Nurse rostering problem, a problem in computer science

Political parties
 National Renaissance Party (United States)
 National Reform Party (disambiguation)
 National Religious Party, in Israel
 New Republic Party (South Africa)
 New Reform Party of Ontario, a defunct party in Ontario, Canada
 New Rights Party, in Georgia
 Nordic Reich Party, in Sweden
 Norodom Ranariddh Party, a royalist opposition party in Cambodia

Other
 Maryland Department of Natural Resources Police, officially abbreviated as NRP
 National Reading Panel
 National Reconciliation Program, a political organization in Burma
 National Reorganization Process, the military dictatorship in Argentina from 1976 to 1983
 National Response Plan, former US Department of Homeland Security plan for domestic incidents
 Navio da República Portuguesa, the ship prefix for Portuguese Navy ships
 Neighbourhood Renewal Programme in Singapore
 Neonatal Resuscitation Program
 Nationally Registered Paramedic, a certification from the National Registry of Emergency Medical Technicians
 Network resource planning
 Nissan Revival Plan
 Northern Rhodesia Police, the national police force of Northern Rhodesia, now Zambia